Río San Javier (San Javier River) is a stream  from the summer town of San Javier in Tucumán Province, Argentina.

References 

Rivers of Argentina
Geography of Tucumán Province